US Club Soccer is a national organization and member of the United States Soccer Federation that works to develop and support soccer clubs in the United States. 

It was founded in 2001 as the National Association of Competitive Soccer Clubs (NACSC).

The organization's philosophy is that clubs are the primary vehicle for player development. Thus, there is a focus on flexibility in areas such as roster rules. US Club Soccer also aims to create a “members for life” culture within its clubs, where players can be developed from childhood through the adult level.

US Club Soccer has members in all 50 U.S. states, and the organization sanctions over 400 tournaments per year. Its headquarters are split between two locations in South Carolina: an executive office in Charleston and administrative office in Myrtle Beach. Membership is organized into four geographic regions, each of which holds two seats on the organization's board of directors.

With five goals of Club Development, Coaching Development, Player Development, Parent Engagement & Education and Player Health & Safety, US Club Soccer offers registration, league- and cup-based competition platforms, player identification and a variety of other programming, resources and services.

US Club Soccer is sponsored by Nike, Inc. and supported by LaLiga through a technical partnership.

Programming
US Club Soccer's offerings include Players First, league- and cup-based competition, player identification and development programs, and additional programs geared toward club support and coaching education.

Players First
Players First is a branded club soccer program for parents and players, which aims to help parents make better choices about where their children should play. In order to help members adopt Players First, US Club Soccer provides resources for clubs, coaches, parents and players.

League-based programs
League-based programming includes the National Premier Leagues (NPL) and Premier Leagues, a collection of US Club Soccer's top leagues from around the country. Champions of the various NPLs advance to the NPL Finals, the organization's annual league-based national championship competition. In addition, US Club Soccer sanctions local competitive leagues, recreational programs and adult leagues.
US Club Soccer and the Elite Clubs National League (ECNL) are collaborating to create a new national competition and development platform for 14-U through 18/19-U boys beginning in August 2017. The Elite National Premier League (ENPL) will provide local and national regular-season competition, national showcase events and postseason playoff competition for top teams across the country. The ENPL features 16 qualifying NPLs and Boys ECNL Conferences around the country.

Cup-based programs
Cup-based programming includes state championship events and US Club Soccer's second national championship, the National Cup, which is open to all members and encompasses a series of regional and state competitions.

id2 Program
Established in 2004, the id2 National Identification and Development Program gives all players (regardless of affiliation) a chance to be identified, developed and scouted for inclusion in the U.S. national team programs.

A national scouting and recommendation program is used to form a pool from which top players are invited to attend an id2 Training Camp. In addition to on-field sessions, the camps feature guest speakers, lectures/classroom sessions and other offerings. The four tours have taken teams to the Netherlands and Germany (2010), England and Scotland (2011) and Spain (2012 and 2013). 

Both the id2 Program and Player Development Programs are Olympic Development Programs as approved by the United States Olympic Committee and U.S. Soccer Federation.

Player Development Programs (PDPs)
Another part of the id2 Program, PDPs are regional identification and development events centered on the National Premier Leagues. Players (both in the NPL and with nearby clubs) receive invitations based on performance and recommendations, and once at a PDP event, they receive coaching and can play in front of U.S. Soccer scouts.

U.S. Open Cup
US Club Soccer's adult teams, are eligible for the Lamar Hunt U.S. Open Cup, which they may reach through a qualifying process. US Club Soccer has received a full slot in the 2013 U.S. Open Cup (a step forward from its previous allotment of a half-slot), meaning qualifying teams will move directly into the tournament without needing to win a play-in game.

In 2012, Stanislaus United Turlock Express became the first US Club Soccer team to reach the cup tournament proper, which it accomplished by defeating the National Premier Soccer League’s Bay Area Ambassadors in a play-in game.

References

 
Soccer governing bodies in the United States
Sports organizations established in 2001